Miklavž na Dravskem Polju is the largest settlement and the seat of the Municipality of Miklavž na Dravskem Polju in northeastern Slovenia. It lies on the right bank of the Drava River southeast of Maribor. The area is part of the traditional region of Styria. It is now included in the Drava Statistical Region.

Name
The name of the settlement was changed from Sveti Miklavž (literally, 'Saint Nicholas') to Miklavž na Dravskem polju (literally, 'Nicholas on the Drava Plain') in 1955. The name was changed on the basis of the 1948 Law on Names of Settlements and Designations of Squares, Streets, and Buildings as part of efforts by Slovenia's postwar communist government to remove religious elements from toponyms.

Church
The parish church from which the settlement and municipality get their name is dedicated to Saint Nicholas and belongs to the Roman Catholic Archdiocese of Maribor. It was first mentioned in written documents dated to 1382, but the current building is a 16th-century structure.

References

External links
 Miklavž na Dravskem Polju on Geopedia

Populated places in the Municipality of Miklavž na Dravskem polju